Bare-Fisted Gallagher is a lost 1919 silent western feature directed by Joseph J. Franz and starring William Desmond. It was produced by Jesse D. Hampton and released through Robertson-Cole soon to amalgamate into Film Booking Offices of America (FBO).

Plot
Bare-fisted Gallagher (William Desmond) has inherited a mine from his uncle.  Gallagher falls in love with a woman bandit, whom he has rescued from an attack by Aliso Pete (Frank Lanning).  Aliso owns the general store, but also turns out to be another bandit.  Gallagher convinces Jem to reform.

Cast
 William Desmond as Bare-Fisted Gallagher
 Agnes Vernon as Jem Mason
 Arthur Millett as Selby Mason
 Frank Lanning as Aliso Pete
 Caroline Rankin as The Old Maid
 Bill Patton as Driver #1
 Scotty MacGregor as Driver #2
 Tom Ashton as Mexican Boy(* uncredited)

References

External links

 
 
 lantern slide

1919 films
1919 Western (genre) films
1919 lost films
American black-and-white films
Films directed by Joseph Franz
Lost American films
Lost Western (genre) films
Silent American Western (genre) films
1910s American films
1910s English-language films